Mohamad Hammoud may refer to:

 Mohamad Hammoud (footballer, born 1980), Lebanese association football goalkeeper
 Mohamad Hammoud (footballer, born 1984), Lebanese association football right-back
 Mohamad Hammoud (footballer, born 1987), Lebanese association football full-back